The Fauvel AV.28 was a design for a fighter plane by Charles Fauvel in the late 1930s.

Design
The AV.28 was conceived as a two-seat, off-center cockpit fighter design powered by two Gnome-Rhône 14M Mars engines. Armament consisted of two  cannon and three  Darne machine guns. Fauvel presented the AV.28 to the French Air Ministry in 1938, but the design was rejected. In April 1940, Fauvel proposed another off-center cockpit design, the three-seat AV.30, to be powered by Pratt & Whitney engines, featuring a centrally controlled hydraulic turret, but France's defeat in 1940 prevented it from being realized.

Variants
Data from: 
AV.28:Two-seat twin fuselage tail-less fighter, to have been powered by two Gnome-Rhône 14M Mars engines.
AV.30:Three-seat twin fuselage tail-less fighter, to have been powered by two Pratt & Whitney R-2800 Double Wasp engines.

Specifications (AV.28)

References

Tailless aircraft
Flying wings
1930s French fighter aircraft
Fauvel aircraft
Twin-engined tractor aircraft